Trenton Merricks is an American philosopher and the Commonwealth Professor of Philosophy at the University of Virginia. While Merricks' primary field of study is metaphysics, he has also published scholarship in epistemology, philosophy of language, and philosophy of religion.

Education and academic postings 
Merricks attended Ohio State University as an undergraduate, and received his doctorate in philosophy the University of Notre Dame under the supervision of the well-known Christian philosopher Alvin Plantinga. Before holding his professorship at the University of Virginia, Merricks served as an Assistant Professor and then an Associate Professor at Virginia Commonwealth University.

Philosophical scholarship 
Merricks's published articles include "Endurance and Indiscernibility" (Journal of Philosophy), "On the Incompatibility of Enduring and Perduring Objects" (Mind), "Persistence, Parts, and Presentism" (Nous), "There are No Criteria of Identity Over Time" (Nous), "Warrant Entails Truth" (Philosophy and Phenomenological Research), "Varieties of Vagueness" (Philosophy and Phenomenological Research), and "Composition and Vagueness" (Mind).

He has also authored and published four books: 

Objects and Persons (Oxford University Press, 2001)
 Truth and Ontology (Oxford University Press, 2007)
 Propositions (Oxford University Press, 2015)
 Self and Identity (Oxford University Press, 2022)

In Objects and Persons, Merricks argues in favor of mereological nihilism, as he contends that composite objects, if they existed, would causally overdetermine their effects since any presumed effect of an object is also an effect of its individual simple parts. Therefore, ostensible composite objects are actually collections of simple parts arranged object-wise, according to Merricks. For example, a chair is really a group of atoms arranged chair-wise. Additionally, Merricks claims that mereological nihilism averts many philosophical puzzles concerning the continued existence of composite objects over time. However, Merricks contends that humans do exist and are not merely synonymous with the atoms which compose them. Since human consciousness has causal power but is not supervened by the set of the simple parts that compose a human body, humans must be distinct from their related sets of physical simples arranged body-wise.

See also
 Mereological nihilism
 Philosophy of religion
 Growing block universe
 Personal identity

References

21st-century American philosophers
Christian philosophers
Living people
Metaphysicians
Epistemologists
Philosophers of religion
University of Virginia faculty
Critics of atheism
Year of birth missing (living people)